Maple Township is a township in Cowley County, Kansas, USA.  As of the 2000 census, its population was 702.

Geography
According to the USGS, it contains two cemeteries: Red Bud and Star Valley.

The stream of Coon Creek runs through this township.

References
 USGS Geographic Names Information System (GNIS)

External links
 City-Data.com

Townships in Cowley County, Kansas
Townships in Kansas